USS APL-18 is an APL-2-class barracks ship of the United States Navy.

Construction and career
The ship was laid down on 29 October 1943, by the Tampa Shipbuilding Co. and launched on 29 January 1944. She was commissioned on 29 September 1944.

She was decommissioned and put into the reserve fleet by January 1947.

The ship undertook the CincPacFlt Berthing and Messing Program, in which she is berthed in San Diego since at least the early 2000s. She is being used as a berthing and messing barge.

References

 

 

Barracks ships of the United States Navy
Ships built in Tampa, Florida
1944 ships